The 1906 Wyoming gubernatorial election was held on November 6, 1906. Incumbent Republican Governor Bryant B. Brooks ran for re-election to a second term. After winning renomination against some intraparty challengers, he faced State Senator Stephen Keister in the general election. Brooks was ultimately able to win re-election by an overwhelming margin, setting a record for the largest majority in a state gubernatorial election, which would not be exceeded until Governor Stanley Hathaway's re-election in 1970.

Party conventions
As the Republican convention began on August 29, 1906, Governor Brooks was seen as a heavy favorite for renomination, but several challengers to Brooks emerged, including State Treasurer William C. Irvine, banker Thomas A. Cosgriff, and L. G. Phelps. Despite the strong challenges, however, Brooks was renominated.

As the Democratic convention began on September 13, 1906, Democratic leaders reported that they had "difficulty finding prominent democrats willing to take places on the ticket," with State Senator Stephen Keister named as the likeliest candidate for Governor. Keister was ultimately nominated, and the Democratic Party adopted a platform endorsing William Jennings Bryan as a candidate for president in 1908 and supporting the direct election of U.S. Senators.

General election

Results

Results by county

References

1906 Wyoming elections
1906
Wyoming